Isaac N. Quinn (April 24, 1795, New Haven, Connecticut – June 26, 1865, San Rafael, California.) was the Acting Lieutenant Governor of California, 1860–61.

1860

President pro Tempore, California State Senate (for 17 days; succeeded by Charles J. Lansing)  He was a Democrat.

1860-1861
Acting Lieutenant Governor (following succession of John G. Downey to Governor).

1861

Resigned as Lieutenant Governor on January 7.

References

Lieutenant Governors of California
California Democrats
1795 births
1865 deaths
19th-century American politicians